Longobardi  may refer to:

 Lombards, a Germanic people who ruled most of the Italian Peninsula from 568 to 774
 Longobardi, Calabria, a comune in the Province of Cosenza, Italy
 Longobardi (surname), Italian surname

See also 
 Longobardo
 Lombardi (disambiguation)